Sun Sumei is an electrical engineer from the Institute for Infocomm Research in Singapore. She was named a Fellow of the Institute of Electrical and Electronics Engineers (IEEE) in 2016 for her work in the design and standardization of wireless communication systems.

References 

Fellow Members of the IEEE
Singaporean engineers
Living people
Year of birth missing (living people)